Glyptozaria is a genus of sea snails, marine gastropod mollusks in the family Turritellidae.

Species
Species within the genus Glyptozaria include:

 Glyptozaria columnaria Cotton & Woods, 1935
 Glyptozaria opulenta (Hedley, 1907)

References

Turritellidae